The Race of UK was the third round of the 2005 World Touring Car Championship season. It was held at the Silverstone Circuit at Silverstone in Britain on May 15, 2005. Gabriele Tarquini won the first race from pole in an Alfa Romeo 1-2-3-4, and Rickard Rydell took a historic first win for SEAT after Andy Priaulx's tyre burst with three laps to go while leading.

Report

Qualifying
After BMW's domination in Magny-Cours, Alfa Romeo fought back here by taking the first three places in qualifying.
Gabriele Tarquini took pole for them, with teammates James Thompson and Fabrizio Giovanardi close behind him. Andy Priaulx was the first of the BMWs in fourth, and Peter Terting got his best qualifying for SEAT in fifth.

Race 1
Pole position man Gabriele Tarquini took off at the start in his Alfa Romeo, with Andy Priaulx jumping up to second from fourth in his home race. Fabrizio Giovanardi, James Thompson and Augusto Farfus followed in three more Alfas. The Alfas set about their task, with Giovanardi getting second from Priaulx before the first lap was complete, with Thompson and Farfus following him soon after, but this allowed Tarquini to quickly get a 1.5 second lead. Behind the top 5, Antonio García was running sixth ahead of the SEATS of Peter Terting and Jason Plato. Giovanardi was unable to close in on Tarquini, despite not allowing his countryman to pull further away. The former was passed by Thompson on lap 4, and the Brit began to close in on Tarquini, with Giovanardi in tow. Priaulx stayed with the Alfas in the early stages, but then got dropped. García now suffered from problems, and was passed by the SEATS of Terting, Plato and Rickard Rydell. At the front, Thompson was unable to pass Tarquini despite putting him under pressure. Tarquini thus took the win with Thompson, Giovanardi and Farfus completing the Alfa 1-2-3-4 ahead of Priaulx's BMW and the three SEATS driven by Terting, Rydell and Plato. The Independent's Trophy was won by Tom Coronel who finished 14th.

Race 2
SEAT cars of Plato, Rydell and Terting started 1-2-3 on the reverse grid, but however it was Priaulx who overtook all three of them at the start to take the lead, with Dirk Müller sensationally jumping from 10th to 4th in his BMW as Fabrizio Giovanardi stalled and resumed in last. A collision between García and Robert Huff's Chevrolet brought out the safety car. The race restarted after 3 laps with Priaulx leading Rydell, Plato, Dirk Müller, Terting, Farfus, Tarquini and Thompson. Priaulx kept his lead but Rydell stayed right with him, whereas Plato was unable to and had to defend from Dirk Müller. Farfus quickly dealt with Terting, and as Tarquini tried to do these same, Thompson sneaked up on both of them. There was contact, and Thompson was sent spinning into the gravel and retired. Priaulx continued to lead with Rydell putting him under pressure; but with 3 laps left, Priaulx suffered a puncture and retired. Rydell gratefully took the lead, with Plato and Dirk Müller following, but soon Tarquini and Farfus passed Dirk. Jordi Gené also did the same in his SEAT, and behind him Jörg Müller took 7th from Terting, clipping the latter into a spin. Rydell took his first career win, with Plato completing a SEAT 1-2 by holding off Tarquini and Farfus. Gene, Dirk and Jörg Müller followed, with Giovanardi recovering to take the final point. Marc Hennerici took his fourth Independents Trophy by finishing 9th.

Classification

Race 1

Race 2

Standings after the races

Drivers' Championship standings

Manufacturers' Championship standings

References

External links

UK
Race